The University of Nigeria, commonly referred to as UNN, is a federal university located in Nsukka, Enugu State, Eastern part of Nigeria. Founded by Nnamdi Azikiwe in 1955 and formally opened on 7 October 1960, the University of Nigeria has three campuses in Enugu State– Nsukka, Enugu, and Ituku-Ozalla – and the Aba campus in Abia State.

The University of Nigeria is the first full-fledged indigenous and first autonomous university in Nigeria, modelled upon the American educational system. It was the first land-grant university in Africa and one of the five most reputed universities in Nigeria. The university has 15 Faculties and 102 academic departments. The university offers 108 undergraduate programs and 211 postgraduate programmes.

The university celebrated its 50th anniversary in October 2010, and would have celebrated its 60th anniversary in October, 2020 save for the COVID-19 pandemic.

History
A law to establish a university in the Eastern Region of Nigeria was passed on 18 May 1955. This date marks the formal beginning of the history of the University of Nigeria, with the enactment of a legislation by several Nigerian leaders, inspired particularly by the then Premier of the Eastern Region, Dr. Nnamdi Azikiwe.

One of the first steps taken by the Eastern Nigeria Government towards the implementation of its commitment was an invitation to both the United States of America and the United Kingdom to send advisers to help in the planning of physical and educational aspects of the proposed university.

Under the joint auspices of the Inter-University Council for Higher Education and Overseas and the International Co-operation Administration (now the United States Agency for International Development), J.W. Cook, Vice-Chancellor of the University of Exeter, Dr. John A. Hannah, President of Michigan State University and Dr. Glen L. Taggart, Dean of International Programs at the same university, came to Nigeria in 1958. The team surveyed the site at Nsukka, and extensively investigated a great variety of factors pertinent to the establishment of a new university.

The results of their efforts were contained in a white paper issued by the Eastern Nigeria Government on 30 November 1958. They had recommended "that the development of the University of Nigeria based upon the concept of service to problems and needs of Nigeria, is a desirable project and one that should receive support from any source which could help to make it a sound endeavor".

They further recommended that a provisional council be established to "draw upon the technical and consultative resources available throughout the world for help in planning the institution".

The provisional council, authorized by the Eastern Nigeria Legislature, was appointed by the Governor in Council in April 1959, and given necessary financial and administrative powers to build a sound university. It reflected the spirit of international co-operation which has given birth to the institution. It consisted of Dr. Nnamdi Azikiwe, chairman, Dr. T. Olawale Elias and Dr. Okechukwu Ikejiani from the Federation of Nigeria, J.S. Fulton from the United Kingdom, Dr. Marguerite Cartwright and Dr. Eldon Lee Johnson from the United States of America.

The university was formally opened on 7 October 1960, as the climax to the Nigerian independence celebrations in the Eastern Region. Her Royal Highness, Princess Alexandra of Kent, representing Her Majesty Queen Elizabeth II at the Nigerian independence celebrations, performed the opening ceremonies and laid the foundation stone of one of the university's early buildings.

Classes began on 17 October 1960 with an enrollment of 220 students and 13 members of the academic staff. The opening convocation addresses were delivered by the Chairman of the Provisional Council, Dr Nnamdi Azikiwe, the first President of the Federation of Nigeria, and by Dr John A. Hannah, President of Michigan State University, USA.

The university was fully autonomous, with the power to grant its own degrees. Technically speaking, therefore, it became the first fully-fledged university in Nigeria, since Ibadan was still at that time a university college granting London degrees. It also became the first university established by a Nigerian Regional Government. The University College Ibadan, the oldest degree awarding institution, cut its umbilical cord with London in January 1963, becoming the University of Ibadan. In July 1967, it turned out the first graduates holding Ibadan (rather than London) degrees, by which time Nsukka had produced two crops of graduates and taken all the publicity for turning out the first graduates of an autonomous Nigerian university.

Campus
The university has four campuses – Nsukka (University of Nigeria, Nsukka, UNN), Enugu (University of Nigeria Enugu campus, UNEC), Ituku-Ozalla (University of Nigeria Teaching Hospital, UNTH) and Aba (University of Nigeria Aba campus, UNAC).

The main campus of the university is located on 871 hectares of hilly savannah in the town of Nsukka, about eighty kilometres north of Enugu, and enjoys a very pleasant and healthy climate. Additionally 209 hectares of arable land are available for an experimental agricultural farm and 207 hectares for staff housing development. There is regular road transport between Nsukka and Enugu, and Nsukka is also quite easily accessible from all parts of Nigeria. There are modern shopping facilities and a large market in Nsukka town.
The Nsukka campus houses the Faculties of Agriculture, Arts, Biological Sciences, Education, Engineering, Pharmaceutical Sciences, Physical Sciences, Social Sciences, and Veterinary Medicine.

The former Nigerian College of Arts, Science and Technology, Enugu, was incorporated into the university in 1961, and its buildings now form the Enugu Campus (200 hectares) of the university located in the heart of Enugu, the administrative capital of Enugu State of Nigeria. Enugu is a modern city, accessible by air, rail and road. The Faculties of Business Administration, Environmental Studies, Law and Health Sciences are located at the Enugu Campus.

The teaching hospital (UNTH) attached to the university is presently sited at Ituku-Ozalla (25 kilometres south of Enugu) on a  site. It also hosts the Faculty of Dentistry/Dental Surgery and Medical Sciences.

The Aba campus (UNAC) hosts the National Institute for Nigerian Languages.

A former campus was opened in October 1973 in Calabar, Cross River State. The campus at Calabar became a full-fledged University of Calabar in October 1977.

The official name of the university is University of Nigeria and the official acronym of the name UNN. "UN" stands for University of Nigeria while the last "N" stands for Nsukka. This acronym is also shared by the main campus of the university, Nsukka (University of Nigeria, Nsukka). Thus technically, the name University of Nigeria, Nsukka refers to the main campus at Nsukka only while the name University of Nigeria refers to all the campuses of the university. References may be made to the location of the other campuses by mentioning the names of the cities where they are situated rather than a blanket description with the name Nsukka. Students at the Enugu Campus prefer to write the name of their school as University of Nigeria Enugu Campus (UNEC) if they must add the location of their school. Students from other campuses of the school also prefer same. Official documents of the school describes the school as simply University of Nigeria. They also make this dichotomy when referring to different campuses of the school.

Religious bodies in UNN 

The Christ Church Chapel, University of Nigeria, Nsukka is a religious body in the University of Nigeria, Nsukka. It is an interdenominational chapel that was founded by a group of devoted Christians who took up the responsibility to pass on Salvation to all humanity in every nation. This is called "Ecumenism" which can also be spelt as Oecumenism. The foundation stone for the chapel building was laid on the 14th of January, 1965. Christ Church Chapel, university of Nigeria, Nsukka, is known to be a religious group that helps the physically challenged within the University of Nigeria, Nsukka and its environs.

St. Peter's Chaplaincy, University of Nigeria, Nsukka is another religious body which came much after Christ Church Chapel, to cater for the needs of the catholic parishioners within the university. It also has a membership of over 800 staff and students and even welcomes indigenes who live around the campus.

Members 

The Christ Church Chapel, UNN membership is determined by a process known as "Membership registration" which is done once and afterwards renewed every year. The Church has more than 850 members that worship in different services every Sunday morning. Christ Church Chapel UNN is made up of arms and units comprising the members. The arms are the Christ Church Men's Association (CCMA), Christ Church Women's Association (CCWA), Christ Church Youth Fellowship (CCYF), Christ Church Chapel Sunday School (CCCSS), and Christ Church Chapel Choir (C4). Every member belongs to one or more arms of the church.

Academic strides
Novelist Chinua Achebe held research and teaching appointments at the university, beginning in the early 1970s. He worked in the faculty of arts with critic and African literature scholar Donatus Nwoga. Astrophysicist Sam Okoye founded the Space Research Center in 1972. The Centre for Basic Space Research remains one of the few institutions in Africa that carries out research and offers courses in astronomy at both the undergraduate and postgraduate levels.

The medical school, in Enugu, has most of it activities in the University of Nigeria Teaching Hospital (UNTH), where doctors and other health workers are trained with high standards and have proven over the years that they can effect a significant positive change in Africa and the entire world's healthcare system. Doctors and nurses trained in the institution have contributed to the advancement of medicine.

The first open heart surgical operation in Nigeria and sub-Saharan Africa was undertaken in 1974 at the University of Nigeria Teaching Hospital (UNTH) Enugu. The team was led by visiting Magdi Yacoub from the UK and others in the team included Professors F.A. Udekwu and Anyanwu. The College of Medicine has since evolved into the centre for cardiothoracic surgery and tropical cardiology excellence for the West Africa region with the siting of the National Cardiothoracic Center at UNTH Enugu. Much medical research is also being carried out in the college. Most of the projects are nearing completion, but it is pertinent to note that some too, have fallen short of completion due to lack of finances and the Government's reluctance to fund private research.

The Department of Fine and Applied Arts is known for the Nsukka group – seven artists associated with a system of traditional Igbo designs and styles known as uli. The seven artists are Uche Okeke, Chike Aniakor, Obiora Udechukwu, El Anatsui, Tayo Adenaike, Ada Udechukwu, and Olu Oguibe.

The Law Faculty of the university is the oldest in Nigeria; it was established in 1960. It has contributed to legal education in Nigeria and has trained lawyers such as the former vice president; Alex Ekwueme, in law practice.

The Department of Electronic Engineering was named a Center of Excellence in Electronics by the Federal Government of Nigeria in 1982. It is  one of the most sought after programs to study at the university. The department has consistently produced the Best Graduating Student of the university and Best Graduating Student in the Faculty of Engineering. It is the first and only school in Nigeria to have Electronics Engineering as an Independent Department.

Of recent, a lot of work has emanated from the Department of Pharmacology and Therapeutics where a new agent against HIV was derived from a local plant source. Named "irab" the new agent is thought to be a fusion inhibitor and studies in initial clinical trials have shown astounding results. Noteworthy also is finding a novel application for an otherwise old drug. Piperazine citrate which is a cheap and safe anthelmintic agent that has almost gone into disrepute was shown to have anti-arrhythmic properties by studies in the department. The investigators have also established that piperazine can protect the heart against sudden cardiac death from ventricular fibrillation.

Research activity is carried out across many institutes and colleges in the university such as the  institutes for African studies, education, developmental studies, postgraduate studies and herbal medicine and drugs research and development. There are also centres instituted to look at studies in Igbo language, climate change, space science and energy research in the university.

Library

The University of Nigeria, Nsukka Libraries consist of the Nnamdi Azikiwe Library, the Enugu Campus Main Library and the Medical Library located at the College of Medicine, University of Nigeria Teaching Hospital, Ituku-Ozalla. On March 8, 2009, the multi- complex Nnamdi Azikiwe Library of University of Nigeria, Nsukka was officially opened by the then minister of Education, Dr Sam Egwu. The library has embraced information technology in order to provide an effective library service to users and this was why it was one of the three leading academic libraries in Nigeria where TINLIB software was introduced in the 90s After so many failed attempt to automate the library using a well robust integrated library management software, the library finally settled for KOHA Integrated library management software to automate it activities. The library collections are unique in nature because it contains an Africana section that houses rare books such as Biafiana and Achebeana. It has a total holding of 350,000 book titles and about 5000 serials titles. The library aside providing access to physical information resources also provide access to electronic resources through subscription to some databases like OARE, JSTOR, AGORA, HINARI and EBSCOHOST.

Research groups
Over 139 research groups exist in the university. The outputs of these groups that spread across faculties, centres, institutes and the library had brought the university to limelight in the global research community.

Faculties
 Agriculture
 Arts
 Basic Medical Sciences
 Biological Science
 Business Administration
 Dentistry
 Education
 Engineering
 Environmental Studies
 Health Sciences
 Law
 Medicine
 Pharmaceutical Science
 Social Sciences
 Physical Sciences
 Veterinary Medicine
 Humanities
 Clinical Sciences

Institutes
 Institute of African Studies
 Institute for Development Studies
 Institute of Mental & Child Health
 Institute for Drugs-Herbal Medicine-Excipient Research and Development (ID-HED-ERD)
 Institute of Education
 Institute of Marine Studies
 Institute of Molecular Medicine & Infectious Diseases
 Institute of Public Health
 UNN Business School
 School of Post Graduate Studies
 School of General Studies

Centres
 African Centre of Excellence for Sustainable Power & Energy Development
 Advancement Centre
 B.I.C Ijeomah Centre for Policy Studies & Research
 Biotechnology Centre
 Centre for Rural Development & Co-operation
 Centre for Basic Space Science
 Centre for Igbo Studies
 Centre for Entrepreneurship & Development Research
 Centre for American Studies
 Centre for Distance & e-learning
 Centre for Environmental Management & Control
 Curriculum Development & Instructional Materials Centre (CUDIMAC)
 Centre for Technical Vocational Education Training and Research (CETVETAR)
 Centre for Climate Change 
 Energy Research Centre
 Equipment Research & Maintenance Centre 
 Gender & Policy Research Centre
 Lion Gadgets & Technologies Centre
 Organization of Women in Science for Developing World
 Resource & Environment Policy Research Centre
 Strategic Contacts, Ethics & Publications (STRACEP)
 UNESCO International Centre for Biotechnology
 Computer Communications Centre

UNN and Roar Nigeria Hub
Roar Nigeria Hub is one of the full-fledged university-embedded ICT Hubs in West Africa. Located in University of Nigeria, an institution with a student population of nearly 40,000 and 12 institutions of higher learning within an hour drive from Enugu city. The immediate past Vice Chancellor, Professor Benjamin Chukwuma Ozumba's drive to create a smart university led to the hub becoming a private sector driven initiative by two engineering graduates of the university.

The Roar Nigeria Hub is within its main site being Nsukka. The Hub is a private sector initiative from two of the university's engineering students. The aim of the hub is to encourage entrepreneurial activity among students and faculty, investing in feasible  student-led ideas, and to help link academia, the public and industry in one body.

Hostels

Female Hostels
 Okpara Hostel
 Balewa Hall
 Akintola Hostel
 Akpabio Hostel
 Isa-Kaita Hall
 Okeke Hostel
 Aja Nwachukwu Hostel
 Bello Hostel
 Eyoita Hostel
 Mary Slessor Hostel
 Nkrumah Hall
 Awolowo Hostel

Male Hostels
 Eni Njoku Hostel
 Alvan Enwerem Hostel

Alumni and faculty
University of Nigeria Nsukka alumni are made up of numerous politicians, like the state governors as well as senators and ministers in the Nigerian and other African governments, academics, actors, artists and business people.

Vice-Chancellors

The Vice-Chancellor is supported by two deputy vice-chancellors. Former and current persons who have fulfilled the position are:
 Professor Charles Arizechukwu Igwe: June 2019–Present
 Professor Benjamin Chukwuma Ozumba: June 2014–June 2019 
Professor Bartho Okolo: 2009 – June 2014
Professor Osita Chinedu Nebo: June 2004 – June 2009
Professor Ginigeme Francis Mbanefoh: 1999 – 2004
Professor Umaru Gomwalk: May 1994 – (appointed as the Sole Administrator)
Professor Oleka K. Udeala:1992 – 1995
Professor Chimere Ikoku: 1985 – 1992
Professor Frank Nwachukwu Ndili: 1980 – Oct. 1985
Professor Umaru Shehu: 1978 – 1979
Professor James O. C. Ezeilo: 1975 – 1978
Professor Herbert C. Kodilinye: 1971 – 1975
Professor Eni Njoku: July 1966 – 1967; 1967 – 1970
Professor Glen L. Taggart: 1964 – 1966
Dr. George Marion Johnson: 1960 – 1964

Affiliate institutions
Below are some approved affiliate institutions of the University of Nigeria, Nsukka by the National Universities Commission (NUC).
 Assemblies of God Divinity School, Old Umuahia
 College Of Education, Ikere-Ekiti (Regular)
 College of Education, Nsugbe
 Digital Bridge Institute, Abuja
 Spiritan International School of Theology, Attakwu, Enugu
 Spiritan School of Philosophy, Issienu, Nsukka
 St. Paul's College, Awka
 Trinity Theological College, Umuahia
 West Africa Theological Seminary, Ipaja, Lagos
 Yaba College of Technology Lagos

References

External links

 
Federal universities of Nigeria
Buildings and structures in Enugu State
Educational institutions established in 1960
1960 establishments in Nigeria
Nnamdi Azikiwe
Academic libraries in Nigeria